Leonardo Ortizgris is a Mexican actor. He is best known for his performance in Güeros and Museum for which he won the 2019 Ariel Award for Best Supporting Actor.

Selected filmography

References

External links 

Year of birth missing (living people)
Ariel Award winners
Living people
Mexican male film actors